David Talbot (born 16 November 1936) is an English professional golfer. He is remembered for winning the Schweppes PGA Championship at Dunbar in 1968, taking the first prize of £1,000. Talbot started the final round five ahead of Irishman Nicky Lynch but took 40 to Lynch's 33 for the first nine holes to be two shots behind. However Talbot came home in 32 to Lynch's 40 to win by five strokes from Bernard Hunt with Lynch dropping into a tie for third place.

Talbot reached the semi-finals of the 1969 News of the World Match Play, losing to the eventual winner Maurice Bembridge. He played in the early years of the European Tour from 1972 to 1980. His best finish was to be runner-up in the 1972 Carroll's International, 4 strokes behind Christy O'Connor Snr.

Talbot was briefly at Hallamshire Golf Club, Sheffield before becoming an assistant to John Jacobs at Sandy Lodge Golf Club, Hertfordshire in 1953. Talbot became the professional at Notts Golf Club in 1960 before moving to Royal Mid-Surrey Golf Club in 1969, replacing Jimmy Adams. He was succeeded at Mid-Surrey by his son, Philip in 1999.

Professional wins (7)
1965 Nottinghamshire Open Championship
1967 Nottinghamshire Open Championship
1968 Schweppes PGA Championship
1977 Sant Cugat Open (Spain)
3 times winner Surrey Open

Results in major championships

Note: Talbot only played in The Open Championship.

CUT = missed the half-way cut (3rd round cut in 1968 and 1970 Open Championships)
"T" indicates a tie for a place

Team appearances
PGA Cup (representing Great Britain and Ireland): 1980 (non-playing captain)

References

External links

English male golfers
European Tour golfers
Sportspeople from Yorkshire
People from Hampton, London
1936 births
Living people